Hobbs is an unincorporated community in west Fisher County, Texas, United States. It lies within the physiographic region known as the Rolling Plains in the valley of the Clear Fork Brazos River.

History
A number of homesteaders moved into the area to form the nucleus of a community in the mid-1880s.  A post office was opened May 26, 1888, and residents chose the name Hobbs for Vachel Hobbs Anderson, a local settler. Unfortunately, the post office was discontinued February 15, 1910. By 1914, the community had a general store, telephone service, and a population of 45. Hobbs received electricity in 1939, and in 1940, the community had three businesses, a school, a Baptist church, a number of scattered dwellings, and a population of 70. The Hobbs Co-op Cotton Gin was organized in the 1940s. From 1970 through 2000, the population of the community remained steady at an estimated 91.

Education
Robert Martin, a Baptist preacher, held camp meetings and opened a school in the community in 1887, using a tent until a combination school and church building was erected the following year. The church-school was called Buffalo, for its location on Buffalo Creek, a tributary of the Clear Fork Brazos River. A new school building was erected in 1908, and the name of the school was changed to Hobbs. The new school gradually became the center of this dispersed community.  In 1925, a number of small schools consolidated to form the Hobbs Rural High School District, and a two-story brick high school was constructed. Hobbs High School was replaced with a new building in 1956, but was closed in 1989, and pupils are now bused to Rotan, Roby, or Snyder.

See also
Brazos River
Double Mountain Fork Brazos River
Duffy's Peak
Hobbs, New Mexico
List of ghost towns in Texas
Wastella, Texas

References

External links

Public domain photos of the Llano Estacado and West Texas

Unincorporated communities in Texas
Unincorporated communities in Fisher County, Texas
1888 establishments in Texas